Lubrication is the process of using a lubricant to reduce friction between two contacting surfaces.

Lubrication may also refer to:

Physics
Acoustic lubrication
Hydrodynamic lubrication
Lubrication theory
Boundary lubrication

Other uses
Vaginal lubrication

See also 
Lubricant
Personal lubricant